Easter is a Christian and cultural annual festival.

Easter may also refer to:

Music

Musicians
 Easter (band), a German electropop band

Albums
 Easter (Patti Smith Group album) or its title track (1978)
 Easter (These Arms Are Snakes album) (2006)

Songs
 "Easter" (Asian Kung-Fu Generation song) (2015)
 "Easter" (Marillion song) (1990)
 "Easter", a song by Jefferson Airplane from Long John Silver
 "Easter", a song by Love Battery from Between the Eyes

Other uses
 Easter (surname)
 Easter (film), a 2002 American drama film
 Easter (play), a 1901 play by August Strindberg
 Easter Sunday (film), a 2022 American comedy film

See also

 Easter customs, cultural traditions and practices that take place during the above festival
 "Easter, 1916", a poem by William Butler Yeats
 Eastertide, a 50-day season in some Christian traditions
 Ēostre, a goddess attested in Old English and namesake of the Easter celebration in Modern English
 Good Easter and High Easter, villages in Essex, England
 
 Easterly (disambiguation)
 Eastar (disambiguation)
 East (disambiguation)